Gökköy can refer to:

 Gökköy, Altıeylül, a village in Turkey
 Gökköy, Çorum
 Gökköy, Lapseki
 Gökköy railway station, a railway station near to the village